The Ukrainian Women's Professional Football League, WFPL, is part of the Ukrainian football clubs competitions among females that consists of two divisions, the Top League (Vyshcha Liha) which has a professional status and the First League (Persha Liha) which was revived in 2013 after 20-year break and is a competition among amateur clubs. Participation of a club in league competitions has to be approved by regional football federations and the All-Ukrainian Association of Women's Football. The All-Ukrainian Association of Women's Football is Ukrainian public organization that governs and organizes all football competitions among females in Ukraine, including the league competitions.

The champion of the Top League qualifies for the UEFA Women's Champions League.

History

The league was created in 1992 with dissolution of the Soviet Union and discontinuation of the Soviet women's football championship that existed only for two seasons 1990 and 1991 (the 1989 season was organized by the Soviet Trade Union Sport Federation). The new Ukrainian league included several teams that participated in the former Soviet championship such as Lehenda Chernihiv, Arena Kyiv, Olimp Kyiv (former Soviet champion Nyva Baryshivka), Dynamo Kyiv, ZHU Zaporizhzhia, Luhanochka Luhansk, Dnipro Dnipropetrovsk, and many others. Kharkiv city teams en masse boycotted the domestic league until introduction of the UEFA Women's Cup.

The first Ukrainian championship consisted of 18 teams that were split into two divisions, the Higher League (10 teams) and the First League (8 teams). The first Ukrainian championship presented a new Donetsk team (as Tekstylnyk Donetsk) that started from the First League and eventually would become one of the most successful clubs in the league. While dominated at first by various teams from Kyiv, starting from 1994 Donchanka (Donechanka) Donetsk became the flagman (flag-woman) of the league dominating until the end of 1990s.

Some six teams that previously competed in Soviet competitions (in 1990 and 1991) chose not to enter the new Ukrainian league in 1992. More teams withdrew from competitions after 1993 causing the second tier (First League) to be disbanded for the next 20 years. The interest in women football never improved in Ukraine and by end of 1990s the league consisted of merely 4 teams playing 4 or 6 leg round-robin tournament between each other.

With turn of millennium, the leadership in the league was overtaken by WFC Lehenda Chernihiv and stayed the leading team for the next decade. Around that time (2001), there was introduced new international tournament UEFA Women's Cup that gave a boost in expansion of the Ukrainian league. For the first time in the league appeared a team from Kharkiv. Later the team at first existing as a department of the main Metalist club, in 2006 was taken over by a local construction company. While the main Donetsk team declined, Chernihiv footballers received a notable competitiveness boost from Kharkiv, Prykarpattia and Azov regions. There also appeared new smaller teams such as Rodyna out of Kostopil in Volhynia and eastern Podollia teams around Uman. In 2008 there was introduced winter break competition which became regular later since 2013.

Following 2010, Lehenda was not able to regain the first position in the league and the league became dominated by Zhilstroi-1 (Zhytlobud-1) Kharkiv. Note that Zhilstroi-1 is a Soviet name for construction company out of Kharkiv which in its name actually carries a number. Also Russian language continues to be dominant in Ukrainian sport and particularly in women football where a lot of teams named in Russian manner i.e. Donchanka, Zhilstroi, Voskhod, Iuzhanka and others. In this situation the women team "Rodyna" has undetermined situation as in Russian and Ukrainian languages carries completely different meanings. Following the 2014 Russian aggression against Ukraine, the league lost its Donetsk team which was disbanded due to the Russian occupation of eastern Ukraine in addition to Crimea. At the same time the Bubka school of Olympic reserve which provided athletes for the team was evacuated to Bakhmut.

Clubs
The following eleven clubs competed in the 2021–22 season.

Top league laureates
The following is a list of all previous champions.

Record champions

Ukrainian Women's League players

All-time table
after the 2021–22 season

Notes:
 Berestivets is a village of Uman Raion.
 Stara Mayachka is a village in Kherson Raion.

Participants with annulled record

All-time participants
The table lists the Higher League teams's place in each of the seasons. The table also tracks the Higher League teams that competed in the lower First League (<1>) when they were relegated or withdrew from the Higher League.

Higher League participants (1992–2012)

Higher League participants (2013–current)

League participants by region
In bold are shown active professional clubs

First League laureates

All-time participants
The table lists the First League teams's place in each of the seasons. The table also tracks the First League teams that competed in the upper Higher League (<^>) when they were promoted or withdrew from the First League.

References

External links
Standings & results at Federation website
League at soccerway.com
Official website – All-Ukrainian Association of Women's Football
Official website of the Women's Football Premier League (WFPL)
Adriana Kovalyshyn, Anton Lytvynets. Origins women's football in the territory Ukraine. Lviv State University of Physical Culture.
Channel of Daria Rakitska (About women football and sport). YouTube. (Information on womensfootball.com.ua)

 
Women's football leagues in Ukraine
Ukraine
Sports leagues established in 1992
1992 establishments in Ukraine
Football
Professional sports leagues in Ukraine